Alien Nation is a 1988 American science fiction action film written by Rockne S. O'Bannon and directed by Graham Baker. The ensemble cast features James Caan, Mandy Patinkin, and Terence Stamp. Its initial popularity inaugurated the beginning of the Alien Nation media franchise. The film depicts the assimilation of the "Newcomers", an alien race settling in Los Angeles, much to the initial dismay of the local population. The plot integrates the neo-noir and buddy cop film genres with a science fiction theme, centering on the relationship between a veteran police investigator (Caan) and an extraterrestrial (Patinkin), the first Newcomer detective. The duo probe a criminal underworld while attempting to solve a homicide.

The film was a co-production between American Entertainment Partners and 20th Century Fox, which distributed it theatrically. Alien Nation explores murder, discrimination and science fiction.

Alien Nation was released in the United States on October 7, 1988, and grossed over $32 million worldwide, becoming a moderate financial success. The film was met with mixed critical reviews before its theatrical release, although it has since gained a cult following. The motion picture spawned a short-lived television series, five television films, a set of comic books, as well as a number of novels, all in an attempt to continue the character development surrounding its fictional alien culture.

Plot
In 1988, a spaceship bearing 300,000 enslaved aliens known as "Newcomers" lands in the Mojave Desert. By 1991, they have settled in Los Angeles and some of them have joined Los Angeles Police Department the city's police department. Detective Matthew Sykes' partner is killed in a shootout while trying to stop two Newcomer criminals from murdering another Newcomer. Sykes's superior, Captain Warner, informs his squad that they will have to work with the newly promoted Newcomer detective Sam Francisco.  Sykes volunteers to team up with Francisco to investigate the homicide of a Newcomer named Warren Hubley, hoping to also be able to investigate his partner's death even though he is officially barred from doing so.

While at a crime lab, Francisco detects an abnormality on the body of one of the Newcomer criminals who was killed in the robbery. This leads Sykes and Francisco to a nightclub to question a Newcomer named Joshua Strader, but Strader is murdered by a criminal ring led by Newcomer businessman William Harcourt and his henchman Rudyard Kipling.

Harcourt is in the advanced stages of launching a scheme to exploit the Newcomers by mass-producing a drug called Jabroka, which was used to pacify Newcomers when they were slaves, but has no effect on humans. The abnormality noticed by Francisco on the body of the Newcomer criminal turns out to be a visual sign of the drug's influence. The Newcomers Hubley, Porter, and Strader were involved in the planning phases of the operation, but were later murdered due to Harcourt's desire to exclude them from any future financial rewards. Ultimately, Sykes and Francisco track down Harcourt, who is negotiating a timetable for the release of Jabroka. The detectives engage in a car chase with Harcourt and Kipling, ending in a head-on collision that leaves both parties injured. Harcourt escapes on foot; when cornered by Sykes, he takes an overdose of Jabroka that causes him to mutate in a larger, more muscular, more violent form. 

Sykes and Francisco pursue Harcourt, catching up with him near a fishing pier, and Sykes fights him hand-to-hand on the open sea. Harcourt's body disintegrates due to direct contact with salt water, which is hazardous to Newcomer physiology. Francisco commandeers a police helicopter and rescues Sykes from the water. Sykes and Francisco, now friends, attend Sykes's daughter's wedding together.  Sykes asks Francisco to forgive him for all the stupid things he might do and say in the years to come, and Francisco reassures Sykes that he will.

Cast

Production

Origins and themes
One out of twenty to twenty-five stories received each week by 20th Century Fox in 1988, Rockne S. O'Bannon's original screenplay for Alien Nation was submitted as a spec–script to producer Gale Anne Hurd. The agency representing the storyline asked the production staff to view it as quickly as possible due to it also being submitted to other film studios. Both Hurd and her director of development Ellen Collett had the same initial response, seeing the script as a real page-turner. According to Hurd, what really interested her about the film's story was the whole approach to the immigrant setting and the extrapolation of that to a science fiction setting. The genre of science fiction, in regards to representing aliens, tends to usually be in the form of one or two beings as shown on network series like Star Trek. Typically, large numbers of stand-ins were not common in film since Planet of the Apes twenty years earlier. Working with co-producer Richard Kobritz, Hurd secured funding from Fox Studios and began casting an experienced makeup team for the creation of the alien society.

Later, Hurd contacted cinematographer Adam Greenberg at his home in Israel to work on the production. Caught by surprise, Greenberg recalled, "I was vacationing on the Dead Sea in a kibbutz (it was 125 degrees) and I got a call from Gale. That was the last thing to expect there."

Though mostly an action movie, Alien Nation was somewhat of a throwback to other similar genre films such as Planet of the Apes  and Silent Running. The alien Newcomers are relegated to a second-class status. Like other minorities, they live in their own neighborhoods, frequent their own clubs, and develop their own underground. Following the murder of a policeman, a human must partner up with an alien to solve the murder. Their uneasy alliance creates a social mistrust, dealing with issues such as prejudice and racism. By the end of the saga, the two completely different humanoids have combined their talents and overcome their social barriers to complete their task.

Makeup

Although several makeup effects companies were considered, 20th Century Fox chose Stan Winston Studios. Winston was not directly involved in the pre-production, but left the task to his top artists–Alec Gillis, Shane Mahan, John Rosengrant, Tom Woodruff, and Shannon Shea. Producer Gale Anne Hurd commented on creating the foundation for the makeup setting saying, "The primary problem was how to sell an alien race that was humanoid without making it look like people in rubber suits—and how to make it affordable. We knew there was going to be a lot of makeup application time and removal time—that was a given." Artist Gillis recalled his involvement in the project saying, "We were involved in everything from designing and sculpting the aliens to supervising a crew of about thirty people. We sculpted the main characters, supervised the molding and production of their appliances and oversaw the sculpting of the secondary and background characters." During the design phase, the producers supported the subtlety of the makeup and trying to make the aliens look as human as possible.

A preliminary design sketch for the aliens as described by Mahan, was that "the males were going to have spines on top of their heads–kind of like a rooster's comb–and when they got angry, these spines would raise up. That would've required a mechanical headpiece, and Graham Baker thought it was a little too extreme so we went with smooth heads instead." Coming close to a final design for the headpiece makeup, Woodruff explained how the masks had "heavier brows and a heavier skin texture that looked more leathery, and there were more pronounced lumps on the backs of their heads. After we went into production on these masks, Graham Baker decided that he wanted the aliens to look even more subtle, so we streamlined the design once we started doing the principal characters."

Mike Spatola was head of the painting crew for the mask design. Hairless by design, the coordinators felt the masks should have spotted marks where hair would be present on humans. Each alien headpiece had to be custom painted with a spotting pattern to match every backup secondary piece used for individual characters. Each of the actors who played aliens also had their hands painted in a spot pattern, as an original plan of supplying them with appliances for hand pieces was discarded.

After the generic alien concept was finalized, each of the effects coordinators worked with a specific actor. Mahan chose to work with Mandy Patinkin, as well as Francisco's son. Rosengrant worked with Leslie Bevis who played Cassandra. Woodruff worked on Terence Stamp who played the part of Harcourt. In trying to emphasize the uniqueness of the  characters, Mahan commented, "We wanted the audience to be able to recognize the actors immediately. They were all so good, it would have been a shame to cover them up completely." Other effects coordinators like Gillis remarked, "The actor who played Trent Porter, for example–Brian Thompson–was a really rugged guy, so he came off looking like a really tough character. On the other hand, Kevyn Major Howard–who played Harcourt's murderous henchman–had very delicate, boyish kind of features, so we used that quality to create a creepy juxtaposition." While effects coordinators were struggling to finish the final design and full-scale production of the alien prosthetics, Hurd chose makeup artist Zoltan Elek to supervise the overall application. Elek had previously worked on the film Mask and the character Max Headroom. Elek insisted that the alien coloration be much more closer to human skin tones rather than the originally chosen yellowish pigment. Elek recalled his disagreement with Winston as Stan felt, "...the aliens should be a totally different color than the humans, with a lot of yellows, blues and grays. To me, that scheme was too monstrous–in fact, we ended up using it on the Harcourt monster at the climax." Another creative aspect of the makeup was the gradation between the principal and background masks. The crew of Alien Nation sought to avoid the same mistakes made in Planet of the Apes twenty years earlier. As explained by Gillis, "We had what we referred to as 'A-B-C-D' makeups, ... The 'A' makeups were those custom designed for the principal actors, while the 'B' makeups were mix-and-match where we would recombine pieces from other actors to create a new character. Our 'D' masks–the ones furthest from camera–were overhead slip latex masks incapable of changing expression. The 'C' masks, however, were made of foam latex and could be glued down to get some expression from the characters in the middleground." Application of the Newcomer makeup known as "spuds" or "potatoheads" on set, required four hours; a task which Patinkin described as being "a pain in the ass." Masks were manufactured in a production line to meet the enormous demand for the film. Mahan mused, "We would pull the pieces out of the oven, fix them up, paint them and have them ready for pickup that afternoon to be taken to the set. The pieces were barely cold when Zoltan and his crew applied them."

For the final dramatic scene involving Harcourt's demise, the rigged effects were handled in two stages. The first stage involved a dissolving head and body, while the second stage incorporated a flesh-less arm thrusting out of seawater. Rosengrant noted, "While the dissolving makeup had to look extreme, it also had to appear realistic within the limits of the alien anatomy Winston's crew had designed. We wanted to avoid the amorphous 'blob-of-blood' look you see in so many of these slasher and monster pictures. We wanted to be able to see Harcourt's bone structure rather than just the glob hanging off of it." For the visual appearance he added, "Of course, we did use methocel slime to make it wet and nasty-looking, but the basic understructure was rooted in anatomy." For Harcourt's facial disintegration, the coordinators came up with a foam rubber base makeup superimposed with a layer of gelatin appliances. Elek explained, the crew "dug out chunks from the foam rubber pieces, filled the holes with Bromo Seltzer, then laid the gelatin appliances over the whole thing and colored them so you could not see the holes below. Once the stuntman, the camera and everyone else was in position, we took a large syringe filled with hot water and injected it into each of the Bromo Seltzer pockets as the camera started rolling. As the Bromo Seltzer started to fizzle, the hot water began eating its way through the gelatin skin and his face appeared to bubble and melt." In the end, Mahan remarked, "We figured that going from something like the alien queen in Aliens to these straight prosthetic makeups would be simple, but it was really a lot of work."

Set design and filming

Numerous interior and exterior locations used to suit the needs of the story were filmed in Los Angeles, California. Within a five-month shooting schedule, three weeks were spent shooting at studio locations. Production designer Jack Collis explained how the film integrates a minority group (the aliens) into the film, saying "The idea was to bring in this alien group, assimilate them into our society, and get them a locale that would be a part of Los Angeles, ... It would look almost as if a group of Koreans or Vietnamese that had moved into the area. This group would have established their own community. They have their own language, their own signs." The film crew installed fictional alien language signs along Western Avenue and Santa Monica Boulevard. Colored drawings were made of all stores on both sides of the street for two full blocks. Painted and electrical signs were designed for each building. Graffiti was also carefully planned out. The film crew did their own painting and even took a big blank concrete wall and inserted alien graffiti for a scene involving an early physical confrontation between the main characters. Essentially, the alphabet of the alien citizens had to be designed as an integral part of their environment. He commented how the crew "came up with individual alphabets and then combined them into certain words like, say, 'enter' and 'open', so that we could repeat them,..." while also mentioning how they "brought in a language expert to give us something the actors could be comfortable with." The Hawthorns, a well known family of sign painters, created most of the alien signs. Collis even mused how at one point, store owners liked, and wouldn't want to take down, the alien graffiti used during filming on their properties. Collis recalled how the alien language resembled "a flowing design more like hand writing than lettering, that looks almost like a heartbeat graph. Occasionally, we'd underline it as though it came from sort of electronic machine, like an IBM report. It turned out to be such a simple thing once we got it going, but we had to go through a process of 'what is this going to look like?' before we got what we wanted."

Certain fictional locations in the film such as the Encounters Club, was filmed at Club Hollywood on Hollywood Boulevard. Set decorator Jim Duffy, who was involved with the exotic dance scene at the club, used unique Austrian drapes to create a see-through design for actress Bevis who portrayed the character of Cassandra to perform around with. Smaller set areas for Cassandra's dressing room, a couple of offices, and a big conference room where Harcourt's drug deal was taking place were built on stages at the film studio. A Van Nuys bus stop set stood in as the taco burrito stand for the amusing scene between Francisco and Sykes relating to raw fast food. Some of the stunt scenes involving an action sequence later in the film was shot at a harbor in San Pedro. For certain scenes within that shot, the production crew built their own custom water tank 44 feet in length and 22 feet in width. Two submerged 75 horsepower motors churned to create artificial waves, while separate raised wind machines worked to create the effect of a helicopter hovering over water. Other practical filming locations included Nichols Canyon Beach, the Los Angeles Police Academy and the York Street police station for interiors. A bar called Monty's in downtown Los Angeles was used for a scene involving the rough alien played by Brian Thompson. The interior of Sykes's house was filmed at a home near the studio, while a location in Beverly Glen stood in for a church in the final wedding scene. Some of the more elaborate sets used extensively in the film, were the Millennium Biltmore Hotel and an Anheuser–Busch plant. The alien villain Harcourt, is introduced at the hotel in the elite Crystal Room. The lobby section of the hotel with its very high ceilings and extensive complement of gold motif, was used in an interview scene between the characters of Harcourt, Kipling and the detectives. Alternatively, the beverage plant was used as a disguise for a petroleum factory. Unused portions of the facility containing steel tanks were used as an interesting gloomy background. A methane lab was recreated with translucent tubes running through them, as though drugs were in the process of being refined. Certain visual smoke effects were also created to copy the look of an oil refinery.

As scripted by writer Rockne S. O'Bannon, Alien Nation was originally called, Future Tense. The film took some of its concept from the TV series In the Heat of the Night, with science fiction elements integrated in the plot. During production, the film had a working title called, Outer Heat, which essentially was an amalgam of In the Heat of the Night and a 1960s science fiction TV series, The Outer Limits. Jack Collis emphasized that the film was not a "space epic" but more of an action film. He admitted, "We did build a spaceship, but it's a simple thing that you see on a TV monitor describing the landing of the aliens several years ago, before they became assimilated into our society. It gives us a background but not a lot of detail,..." Collis noted that the film was even "reminiscent of the work I did in Cocoon." An earlier draft of the film was actually written by director James Cameron in 1987, but his name however, was not credited in the final cut of the film. One conceit of the script was that immigrations officials ran out of names for the 300,000 aliens, and began to name them after familiar appellations of the past. Actor Mandy Patinkin's original name for his character was set to be George Jetson. However, three days before the start of shooting, Hanna-Barbera wouldn't allow the name to be used. Expressing his disappointment, Patinkin said, "I assumed that the name of the character I agreed to play was George Jetson. And I was pretty pissed off that there was a screw-up and that the name couldn't be used." He went on to say, "I thought it made a tremendous difference to the piece that the guy's name was George Jetson because it gave a cartoon feeling, an innocence that was important to the movie's whole idea. It's a great loss to the piece that we couldn't recover, a great misfortune that couldn't be solved. It would have helped a lot." In reference to the cartoon character, the producers would leave in the name "George" as a substitute. Patinkin added, "Everything in the script is Jetson, everything on the makeup is labeled Jetson, we always refer to him as Jetson. Not even George, but Jetson. So in our minds, he's George Jetson. So as far as I'm concerned, anybody who sees the movie, they're watching George Jetson no matter what the hell they call him." To understand his role of being a police officer, Patinkin spent two weeks hanging out with the New York City Police Department. He took their training course, joined them on patrol, and spent time with them at the firing range. Commenting on the character development of Francisco, he said "It's one of the better jobs that people from his race have acquired. He feels very proud of the fact that he's able to be a cop." In 2013, when asked about his role in the film, Caan initially replied, "Why would you bring up that?" before stating, "Yeah, well, I don't know. I don't have too many ... [Hesitates.] I mean, I loved Mandy Patinkin. Mandy was a riot. But ... I don't know. It was a lot of silly stuff, creatively. And we had this English director who I wasn't really that fond of. I mean, nice guy, but ... it was just one of those things where, you know, you don't quit, you get through it. It certainly wasn't one of ... I wouldn't write it down as one of my favorite movies. But it was pretty popular."

Cinematography
Cinematographer Adam Greenberg, whose previous film credits included Three Men and a Baby, La Bamba and Near Dark, approached the film with a unique documentary-style technique. Commenting on the initial photography lighting tests, Greenberg remarked, "The first ones were a disaster. They didn't look good at all. I didn't know how to photograph these aliens. It was the first time I had to deal with this kind of thing. But I have an eye and I learned from these tests." At the Biltmore Hotel, a peculiar situation arose where the ceilings were simply too tall for standard lighting equipment. An ingenious idea was devised by the crew to have six to eight weather balloons sent up and have artificial light bounce off of them to create the proper lighting mood. Greenberg remarked, "I wanted a very rich look from that place, gold and very warm. In the story it is very late after a big party. I wasn't going for any special effect, just nice light from lamps on the tables. The problem was, the hotel management wouldn't let us hang anything from the ceiling. In pre-production they had told us we could hang lights, but I didn't believe them. The ceilings there are very high and very beautiful."

On character interactions, Greenberg noted how there was "a lot of dialogue between Jimmy and Mandy in the car. We used a lot of car mounts. I would light the alien so that he looked good, but if he passed into a shadow while going down the street you could see all the seams in his make-up. So I sometimes had to block all the streets with black paper." The aliens were not too different from humans, and an incorrect lighting or camera angle could give away seams in the makeup. In attempting to identify the aliens with a unique look, Greenberg chose a deep blue color for filming. He said, "We ended up with very deep, strong blue – a sort of moonlight blue. We tried to do all the scenes in the movie that appear to be their places heavily favored by this deep blue color. The Encounters Club was one of those places." Greenberg used Arriflex cameras and Zeiss lenses along with Fuji stock. Commenting on film grain he said, "I figured out from tests that it is better for me to use Fuji. Once film is blown up to 70mm the grain will stand out more and Fuji has smaller grain than Kodak. I can control the contrast with light, but I have to live with the grain." Making use of multiple cameras, Greenberg noted, "Photographically, of course, one camera is best. But as a movie maker, and because I want the film to be a success, I realize that the photography is not the most important thing. The whole movie is most important. So in pre-production, I was the one pushing the director to always shoot with two or three cameras."

Lighting challenges were abound for Greenberg as most of the film took place at night. One of the simplest techniques for lighting employed by Greenberg was using a car's headlights to dramatically produce a scene of terror. Greenberg explained, "We had a scene on Zuma Beach where the bad guys are dragging somebody into the ocean. I wanted to have a very hard, but very natural, and strong look. So, I used the car headlights. It was nice because everything behind the villains fell into darkness. It had a surrealistic look." Greenberg also remarked how he had a close working relationship with DeLuxe lab in getting the correct color for the extensive night shooting in the film by bluntly saying, "In a movie like this I wanted the blacks to be very black, so I worked closely with DeLuxe lab..." He felt the daily challenges of night shooting visibly enhanced the appeal of Alien Nation by figuratively mentioning, "as a cameraman, you can create a lot more at night. Sometimes you have to feel your way. You also have true control at night. If a light is on it is because you turned it on."

Music and soundtrack

The score for the film was originally composed by Jerry Goldsmith, but later rejected in favor of music composed by Curt Sobel. Goldsmith's score was however used for the film's theatrical trailer. Musical artists Smokey Robinson, The Beach Boys, Michael Bolton, Mick Jagger and David Bowie among others, contributed songs which appear in the film. The audio soundtrack in Compact Disc format composed by Sobel was never officially released, but a limited edition of the original score initially composed by Goldsmith featuring 18 tracks, was released in 2005. The score was entirely synthesized and limited to 3,000 copies. The melody featured throughout the film recorded by Goldsmith, was originally composed for the movie Wall Street. After being rejected for both that film project and later Alien Nation, the score was used in the 1990 film The Russia House. The sound effects in the film were supervised by Mark Mangini. The mixing of the sound elements were orchestrated by David MacMillan and Charles Wilborn.

Release

Box office
The film premiered in cinemas on October 7, 1988. At its widest distribution in the U.S., the film was screened at 1,436 theaters grossing $8,421,429, averaging $5,889 in revenue per theater in its opening weekend. During that first weekend in release, the film opened in first place beating out the films, The Accused and Punchline. The film's revenue dropped by 49% in its second week of release, earning $4,252,252. In the month of November during its final weekend showing in theaters, the film came out in 10th place grossing $1,306,849. The film went on to top out domestically at $25,216,243 in total ticket sales through a 5-week theatrical run. Internationally, the film took in an additional $6,938,804 in box office business for a combined total of $32,155,047. For 1988 as a whole, the film would cumulatively rank at a box office performance position of 41.

Home media
Alien Nation was released on VHS by CBS/Fox Video in 1989. One currently available VHS version of the film was originally released on September 10, 1996. The Region 1 Code widescreen edition of the film was released on DVD in the United States on March 27, 2001, and includes a narrative and interview filled Featurette, a Behind the Scenes clip featuring director Graham Baker, a TV Spots special, the Theatrical Trailer and Fox Flix theatrical trailers for The Abyss, Aliens, Enemy Mine, Independence Day and Zardoz. Currently, there is no exact set date on a future US Blu-ray Disc release for the film. The film was released on blu-ray in Australia in April 2016 and in Europe (Region B locked) in March 2017.

Reception

Critical response
The film received mixed reviews from critics. Rotten Tomatoes reported that 53% of 32 sampled critics gave the film a positive review, with an average score of 5.4 out of 10. At Metacritic, which assigns a weighted average out of 100 to critics' reviews, Alien Nation was given a score of 45 based on 10 reviews.

Among critics, Roger Ebert of the Chicago Sun Times, gave the film two stars in a mostly negative review, saying the film lacked a science fiction theme and was more akin to a police murder revenge flick, musing "they've just taken the standard cop-buddy-drug lord routine and changed some of the makeup. The Newcomers have no surprises." Regarding the fictional alien culture, he expressed disappointment saying "a feeble attempt is made to invest the Newcomers with interest, by having them get drunk on sour milk instead of booze, and depriving them of any sense of humor." However, on a slightly complimentary note, Ebert mentioned "the makeup took trouble, the photography looks good, the cast and technical credits are top-drawer." But overall, he summed it up by declaring "Alien Nation feels like a movie made by people who have seen a lot of movies, but don't think the audience has." In agreement with Ebert over the originality of the buddy cop genre with the aliens inserted in as just a new rendition, Rita Kempley of The Washington Post said, "Alien Nation wants to be In the Heat of the Night as science fiction, but it's neither morally instructive nor prophetic. It proves a lumbering marriage of action and sci-fi that alienates both audiences. It's too dull for one and too dumb for the other." Kempley did find the first half hour to be suspenseful, though: "...well paced, brawny and intense, looks like it was made by another director. But the rest is the cinematic equivalent of overcooked asparagus." However, the more enthusiastic staff of Variety found originality in the extraterrestrial–injected plot, saying, "Solid performances by leads James Caan and his humanoid buddy-cop partner Mandy Patinkin move this production beyond special effects, clever alien makeup and car chases" while also adding the film was a "compelling humanhumanoid drama."

Another positive review centering on the science fiction elements of the film was relayed by Janet Maslin of The New York Times. She praised the theme, saying, "Alien Nation has the best science-fiction idea this side of The Terminator." However, Maslin was quick to admit the film "settles down, with remarkable ease, into the routine of a two-cop buddy film, extraterrestrials and all. Matthew and Sam (whom Matthew refuses to address that way, renaming him George) go through all the familiar stages of forging a friendship between partners: cool antipathy, exchanges of insults, growing mutual respect on the job and, finally, an all-night drinking binge to solidify their buddyhood." On a negative front, author Jay Carr of The Boston Globe commented on James Caan's performance, viewing him as "Looking like a Paul Newman gone wrong,..." He went on, further stating that "the film's air of enlightenment is only makeup deep. And while Alien Nation is no smarter than, say, a Lethal Weapon, it hasn't got the juice or the level of sensory jolt a Lethal Weapon supplies." Other critics such as Gene Siskel acknowledged the similarities between other police thriller movies, but still found the film to be a "Genuinely entertaining version of that old reliable; a cop buddy picture with two very different detectives." He explained, "Now this is an example of how you can put a nice twist on a familiar story, and it will work if it's been fully written. Caan and Patinkin have special characters to play." Compelled by the acting, he felt "The buddy combination here worked for me." He ultimately gave the film a "Thumbs Up" review. Not nearly as impressed with the film was author NF of TimeOut Magazine, calling it "worthy, predictable, and dull." A summation of the negativity was, "Played hard and fast, the film might just have worked, but the decision to soft-pedal the violence merely emphasizes the obviousness of the liberal point-scoring (parallels with Vietnamese or Nicaraguan refugees are so facile as to be crass)." Critic Leonard Maltin referred to the film as "a great concept that doesn't quite pay off." But in a hint of commendation, he remarked how the film contains "many clever touches and terrific performances by Caan and Patinkin."

Accolades
The film won the Saturn Award for Best Science Fiction Film of 1988, and received two Saturn nominations for Best Supporting Actor for Mandy Patinkin as well as Best Make-Up for John M. Elliott Jr. and Stan Winston. The film also received two other nominations, among them for Best Dramatic Presentation from the Hugo Awards and Best Film for Graham Baker from the Fantasporto International Fantasy Film Awards.

In other media

TV series

The following year after the film's release, the extraterrestrial plot concept was used as the basis for a television series of the same name. The show attempted to move away from the original film's "Buddy Cop" premise, and delve more into the aliens' distinct culture and characteristics. Premiering on September 18, 1989, the series aired 22 episodes and ran for a single season, ending on May 7, 1990. Gary Graham played the lead role of Matt Sikes, while Eric Pierpoint was chosen to play the character of the Tenctonese newcomer George Francisco. Supporting acting roles were played by Michele Scarabelli, Lauren Woodland and Sean Six. Contributing directors to various episodes included Harry Longstreet, Stan Lathan, Lyndon Chubbuck and Kenneth Johnson. Writing credits were assigned to Steve Mitchell, Kenneth Van Sickle and Kenneth Johnson among others.

TV films

Following the demise of the television series in 1990, plans were devised to continue the popularity of the concept surrounding the race of the Newcomers through a string of television films. Premiering on October 25, 1994, the first of five sequels entitled Alien Nation: Dark Horizon, was released with a plot surrounding a distinct Newcomer arriving on Earth attempting to lure the aliens back into a life of slavery. The film was written on a screenplay conceived by Andrew Schneider and Diane Frolov. Alien Nation: Body and Soul followed on October 10, 1995, with a story revolving around a slaveship medical experiment involving a child who appears to be part human and part Newcomer. A side plot also involves the character of Sikes and a female Tenctonese exploring a relationship. Harry and Renee Longstreet were credited writers for the storyline. The franchise saw two more sequels in 1996. Alien Nation: Millennium was released on January 2, 1996, and dealt with a mysterious cult that uses mind-altering alien artifacts to lure Newcomer followers into a doomsday scenario. The film's plot was a tie-in to one of the television episodes titled: Generation to Generation that premiered on January 29, 1990. Alien Nation: The Enemy Within was aired on November 12, 1996, and revolved around a story from which the detectives try to save their city from an alien threat originating from a waste disposal facility. Racism was a key theme encountered by the character of Francisco. The fifth and final sequel appeared on July 29, 1997. Alien Nation: The Udara Legacy, finds the detectives trying to stop a resistance group among the Newcomers trying to indoctrinate those among them into causing mayhem. A side plot involved the younger Newcomer Buck, played by actor Sean Six, enlisting to become a police officer. All the sequels in the series were directed by producer Kenneth Johnson.

Comics

Between 1990 and 1992, Malibu Comics printed several comics adaptations.

Books

In 1993, Pocket Books, a division of Simon & Schuster, published a novel series, including the Judith and Garfield Reeves-Stevens' Day of Descent, Peter David's Body and Soul, along with Barry B. Longyear's The Change and Slag Like Me.

Remake
On March 25, 2015, Fox announced a remake with Art Marcum and Matt Holloway writing. On September 9, 2016, Deadline reported that Jeff Nichols will write and direct the film. However, the film was later put on hold. On January 25, 2021, it was announced that Nichols would remake the film as a ten-part television series.

See also
 District 9
 Bright

References

External links
 
 
 
 
 

1988 films
1980s science fiction action films
20th Century Fox films
Alien Nation films
American buddy cop films
American science fiction action films
1980s English-language films
Fictional-language films
Fictional portrayals of the Los Angeles Police Department
Films about racism
Films adapted into television shows
Films directed by Graham Baker
Films set in 1991
Films set in the future
Films set in Los Angeles
Films shot in Los Angeles
Films produced by Gale Anne Hurd
American neo-noir films
American police detective films
Films adapted into comics
Films with screenplays by Rockne S. O'Bannon
1980s buddy cop films
1980s American films